Adenocarcinoma (plural adenocarcinomas or adenocarcinomata ) (AC) is a type of cancerous tumor that can occur in several parts of the body. It is defined as neoplasia of epithelial tissue that has glandular origin, glandular characteristics, or both. Adenocarcinomas are part of the larger grouping of carcinomas, but are also sometimes called by more precise terms omitting the word, where these exist. Thus invasive ductal carcinoma, the most common form of breast cancer, is adenocarcinoma but does not use the term in its name—however, esophageal adenocarcinoma does to distinguish it from the other common type of esophageal cancer, esophageal squamous cell carcinoma. Several of the most common forms of cancer are adenocarcinomas, and the various sorts of adenocarcinoma vary greatly in all their aspects, so that few useful generalizations can be made about them.

In the most specific usage (narrowest sense), the glandular origin or traits are exocrine; endocrine gland tumors, such as a VIPoma, an insulinoma, or a pheochromocytoma, are typically not referred to as adenocarcinomas but rather are often called neuroendocrine tumors. Epithelial tissue sometimes includes, but is not limited to, the surface layer of skin, glands, and a variety of other tissue that lines the cavities and organs of the body. Epithelial tissue can be derived embryologically from any of the germ layers (ectoderm, endoderm, or mesoderm). To be classified as adenocarcinoma, the cells do not necessarily need to be part of a gland, as long as they have secretory properties. Adenocarcinoma is the malignant counterpart to adenoma, which is the benign form of such tumors. Sometimes adenomas transform into adenocarcinomas, but most do not.

Well differentiated adenocarcinomas tend to resemble the glandular tissue that they are derived from, while poorly differentiated adenocarcinomas may not. By staining the cells from a biopsy, a pathologist can determine whether the tumor is an adenocarcinoma or some other type of cancer. Adenocarcinomas can arise in many tissues of the body owing to the ubiquitous nature of glands within the body, and, more fundamentally, to the potency of epithelial cells. While each gland may not be secreting the same substance, as long as there is an exocrine function to the cell, it is considered glandular and its malignant form is therefore named adenocarcinoma.

Histopathology

Examples of cancers where adenocarcinomas are a common form:
 esophageal cancer; most cases in the developed world are adenocarcinomas.
 pancreas; over 80% of pancreatic cancers are ductal adenocarcinomas.
 prostate cancer is nearly always adenocarcinoma
 cervical cancer: most is squamous cell cancer, but 10–15% of cervical cancers are adenocarcinomas
 stomach cancer: is almost always an adenocarcinoma but in rare cases are extranodal marginal zone B-cell lymphomas (also termed MALT lymphomas).

Breast
Most breast cancers start in the ducts or lobules, and are adenocarcinomas. The three most common histopathological types collectively represent approximately three-quarters of breast cancers:
 Invasive ductal carcinoma: 55% of breast cancers
 Ductal carcinoma in situ: 13%
 Invasive lobular carcinoma: 5%

Colon

The vast majority of colorectal cancers are adenocarcinomas. This is because the colon has numerous glands. Normal colonic glands tend to be simple and tubular in appearance with a mixture of mucus-secreting goblet cells and water-absorbing cells. These glands secrete mucus into the lumen of the colon to lubricate the feces as they pass towards the rectum.

When these glands undergo a number of changes at the genetic level, they proceed in a predictable manner as they move from benign to an invasive, malignant colon cancer. In their research paper "Lessons from Hereditary Colorectal Cancer", Vogelstein, et al., suggested that colon cells lose the APC tumor suppressor gene and become a small polyp. Next, they suggested that k-Ras becomes activated and the polyp becomes a small, benign adenoma. The adenoma, lacking the "carcinoma" attached to the end of it, suggests that it is a benign version of the malignant adenocarcinoma. The gastroenterologist uses a colonoscopy to find and remove these adenomas and polyps to prevent them from continuing to acquire genetic changes that will lead to an invasive adenocarcinoma. Vogelstein et al. went on to suggest that loss of the DCC gene and of p53 result in a malignant adenocarcinoma.

There will be a mass of a different color to the surrounding tissue. Bleeding from the tumor is often apparent as the tumor tends to grow blood vessels into it in a haphazard manner via secretion of a number of angiogenesis promoting factors such as VEGF. Histologically, tumours resembling the original structures are classified as well differentiated. Tumour cells that have lost any resemblance to original tissue, both in appearance and structure form, are denoted as poorly differentiated tumour cells. Regardless of the grade, malignant tumors tend to have a large nucleus with prominent nucleoli. There will also be a noticeable increase in the incidence of mitosis, or cell divisions.

Lung

Nearly 40% of lung cancers are adenocarcinomas, which usually originates in peripheral lung tissue. Most cases of adenocarcinoma are associated with smoking; however, among people who have smoked fewer than 100 cigarettes in their lifetimes ("never-smokers"), adenocarcinoma is the most common form of lung cancer. A subtype of adenocarcinoma, the bronchioloalveolar carcinoma, is more common in female never-smokers, and may have a better long-term survival.

This cancer usually is seen peripherally in the lungs, as opposed to small cell lung cancer and squamous cell lung cancer, which both tend to be more centrally located.

Other
 Cholangiocarcinoma, or bile duct cancer
 Vaginal cancer
 Cancer of the urachus
 Stomach cancer
 Prostate cancer

Etymology
The term adenocarcinoma is derived from adeno-, meaning "pertaining to a gland", and carcinoma, which describes a cancer that has developed in the epithelial cells.

See also

References

External links 

 
 "Adenocarcinoma"—NCI Dictionary of Cancer Terms
 Surgical Videos, Images and Case Studies of Adenocarcinoma of the Sinuses

Carcinoma
Infectious causes of cancer